Billy Marek (born c. 1954) is a former American football running back.  He played college football for the University of Wisconsin–Madison from 1972 to 1975. He gained more than 1,200 rushing yards for three consecutive years from 1973 to 1975. He concluded his college football career with 740 yards and 13 touchdowns in the final three games of the 1974 season, including a Wisconsin Badgers football record 304 rushing yards against Minnesota.  Of course this didn't actually 'conclude his career' since he played the whole next season yet.  He also set Wisconsin career records with 3,709 rushing yards and 277 points scored, led the country with 114 points in 1974, and was named the State of Wisconsin's  "Sports Personality of the Year" in 1974. He was inducted into the University of Wisconsin Hall of Fame in 1994.

Marek did not have a substantial professional career but did briefly play for the Chicago Fire of the minor league American Football Association in 1981.

See also
 List of NCAA major college football yearly scoring leaders

References

Living people
American football running backs
Wisconsin Badgers football players
Year of birth missing (living people)